is a Japanese manga series written and illustrated by Chorisuke Natsumi. It has been serialized on Akita Shoten's online platform Manga Cross since September 2018.

Premise
One day while on his way to school, Yuu Usami meets a new transfer student named Hitomi Takano, who has an intimidating appearance. However, he later discovers she is actually shy. Yuu befriends Hitomi and over time, they start to develop feelings for each other.

Characters 
 
Hitomi is a first-year high school student who has a scary appearance, but is actually shy and wants to be more social. She befriends Yuu on their way to school after Yuu realizes Hitomi is far more gentle and friendly than her intimidating presence suggests.
   
Yuu is a second-year high school student who befriends Hitomi. He is nicknamed "Usa-kun" for being short. While not nearly as athletic as Hitomi or Kaoru, he is a good student and tutors Hitomi in math.

Kaoru is Yuu's younger sister, and Hitomi's classmate. She is much more athletic than Yuu and naturally outgoing. She admires that Hitomi has large breasts and toned abs.

Publication
Written and illustrated by Chorisuke Natsumi, Hitomi-chan is Shy With Strangers debuted on Akita Shoten's online platform  on September 20, 2018. Akita Shoten has collected its chapters into individual tankōbon volumes. The first volume was released on May 20, 2019.

In May 2021, Seven Seas Entertainment announced that they had licensed the series for English release in North America in both physical and digital format. The first volume was released on October 5, 2021.

Volume list

Reception
In a review of the first volume, Caitlin Moore of Anime News Network called the series a "mediocre iteration of the [romantic comedy] genre." Moore compared the series art and humor to Azumanga Daioh, adding, however, that the characters are less appealing. Moore called the humor repetitive and criticized the "overreliance on fanservice", concluding: "I can only really see two particular subsets of manga fans getting into it: those who have never come across this subgenre before and thus don't know how unoriginal it is and those who love this subgenre and consume everything in it they find. If neither of those describe you, however, this one is better off skipped."

References

External links
  at Manga Cross  
 

Akita Shoten manga
Japanese webcomics
Romantic comedy anime and manga
School life in anime and manga
Shōnen manga
Seven Seas Entertainment titles
Slice of life anime and manga
Webcomics in print